In the run up to the 2019 Portuguese legislative election (to be held on 6 October 2019), various organisations carry out opinion polling to gauge voting intention in Portugal. Results of such polls are displayed in this article.

The date range for these opinion polls are from the previous legislative election, held on 4 October 2015, to the present day.

Nationwide polling

Graphical summary

Polling

Poll results are listed in the table below in reverse chronological order, showing the most recent first. The highest percentage figure in each polling survey is displayed in bold, and the background shaded in the leading party's colour. In the instance that there is a tie, then no figure is shaded but both are displayed in bold. The lead column on the right shows the percentage-point difference between the two parties with the highest figures. Poll results use the date the survey's fieldwork was done, as opposed to the date of publication.

Constituency polling

Lisbon district

Madeira

Porto district

Leadership polls

Preferred Prime Minister
Poll results showing public opinion on who would make the best Prime Minister are shown in the table below in reverse chronological order, showing the most recent first.

António Costa vs Rui Rio

António Costa vs Passos Coelho

António Costa vs Santana Lopes

Cabinet approval/disapproval ratings

Graphical summary

Polling
Poll results showing public opinion on the performance of the Government are shown in the table below in reverse chronological order, showing the most recent first.

Notes

External links 
 Marktest Opinion Poll Tracker
 ERC - Official publication of polls
 Average of polls and seat simulator

Opinion polling in Portugal